Charles Herbert Smith (13 February 1909 – 10 April 1976) was a New Zealand rugby union and professional rugby league footballer who played in the 1930s and 1940s. He played representative level rugby union (RU) for New Zealand (Heritage № 406) (non-test matches), South Island and Otago (captain), and at club level for Southern RFC , as a centre, i.e. number 12 or 13, switching codes in 1936.

Playing career

International honours
Smith represented New Zealand (RU) in the 16–13 victory over New South Wales at Sydney on Monday 6 August 1934, and scored a try in the 35–3 victory over Newcastle at Newcastle, New South Wales on Wednesday 22 August 1934, but was not selected for the 1935–36 New Zealand rugby union tour of Britain, Ireland and Canada, and represented British Empire XIII (RL) in 15–0 victory over France at Stade Buffalo, Paris on Monday 1 November 1937.

Inter-Island honours
Smith played for South Island in the match against North Island in the 1933 season, and as a replacement against North Island in 1934 season.

Ranfurly Shield appearances
Smith played for Otago in the defeats by Canterbury in the 1931 and 1933, and was captain in the 15–6 victory over Canterbury in 1935, and the three defences in 1936.

Club career
Smith made his début for Halifax on Saturday 5 December 1936, and made his last appearance on Saturday 25 December 1948.

Challenge Cup Final appearances
Charles Smith played right-, i.e. number 3, in Halifax's 2-9 defeat by Leeds in the 1940–41 Challenge Cup Final during the 1940–41 season at Odsal, Bradford, in front of a crowd of 28,500.

Honoured at Halifax
Smith is a Halifax Hall of Fame Inductee.

References

External links
Profile at stats.allblacks.com
Search for "Smith" at espnscrum.com

1909 births
1976 deaths
British Empire rugby league team players
Footballers who switched code
Halifax R.L.F.C. players
New Zealand international rugby union players
New Zealand rugby league players
New Zealand rugby union players
Rugby league centres
Rugby league players from Dunedin
Rugby league wingers
Rugby union centres
Rugby union players from Dunedin
South Island rugby union players
Streatham and Mitcham R.L.F.C. players